The Old Banks County Courthouse is in Homer, Georgia. Construction started in 1860 but was interrupted because of the American Civil War. Construction was paid for with $6,600 in Confederate money. Construction was finished in 1875. (The Georgia Courthouse Manual dates it as completed in 1863.) The building is a two-story brick courthouse with a stone foundation in the Greek Revival style. It is similar to many courthouses in Virginia, which is a result of the builders being from Virginia. It has Tuscan columns that are on top of one-story brick piers. The interior originally had a cross plan. The courtroom and judge's chambers are on the second floor, which are accessed by outside double stairways.

A new courthouse replaced this one in 1987. There were plans to demolish the building, but the citizens voted by more than a 2:1 margin to save it. It was restored in 1987–1989 with funding through a hotel/motel tax.

It was added to the National Register of Historic Places in 1980.

References

Courthouses on the National Register of Historic Places in Georgia (U.S. state)
National Register of Historic Places in Banks County, Georgia
Greek Revival architecture in Georgia (U.S. state)
Government buildings completed in 1860
Banks County, Georgia